The year 1801 in archaeology involved some significant events.

Explorations

Excavations

 The first complete mastodon skeleton is excavated, before dinosaurs were discovered.

Publications

Finds

Awards

Events
 The first of the Elgin Marbles brought from Athens to London by Thomas Bruce, 7th Earl of Elgin.

Births
 Joseph Barnard Davis, English craniologist (d. 1881)

Deaths

Archaeology by year
Archaeology